Gholamreza Takhti (August 27, 1930 – January 7, 1968) was an Iranian Olympic Gold-Medalist wrestler and Varzesh-e Bastani (Persian Traditional Sport) practitioner. Popularly nicknamed Jahân Pahlevân (جهان پهلوان; "The World Champion") because of his chivalrous behavior and sportsmanship (Javanmardi in Iranian culture), he was the most popular athlete of Iran in the 20th century, although dozens of Iranian athletes have won more international medals than he did.
Takhti is still a hero to many Iranians. He is listed in the UWW hall of fame.

Early life 
Takhti, the youngest child of a poor family, was born in Khaniabad neighborhood of south Tehran‌. on August 27, 1930. At the age of 15, he entered Poulad Club in Southern Tehran and was trained in wrestling. He soon left Tehran to become a manual laborer in the oil-rich city of Masjed Soleiman. When he was called up for military service, his potential in wrestling was discovered and he began to train seriously soon after he was recruited as an Iran Railways employee in 1948.

Career 
Takhti won his first Iranian championship in 1950, and on his first trip abroad in 1951, he won a silver medal at the world freestyle championships in Helsinki - the first international medal ever gained by an Iranian wrestler. One year later, he won another silver medal, again in Helsinki, this time in the 1952 Summer Olympic Games.

The subsequent highlights of his career were the gold medal in the 1956 Summer Olympic Games in Melbourne, a gold in the world championships in 1959 (Tehran), another silver in the 1960 Summer Olympic Games in Rome and a silver in the 1961 World Championships in Yokohama. His Olympics career finished with one gold medal & two silver medals. He did however finish fourth in the 1964 Tokyo Olympics as well.

Takhti started as a middleweight wrestler in the 79 kg and 87 kg categories, as he was getting heavier, he decided to move up to the next weight, 97 kg, for the 1964 Summer Olympic Games in Tokyo. He was unable to win a medal and he finished in 4th place.

Character and Personality 
Takhti tended to act fairly when competing against rivals during his career, something which originated from traditional values of Zurkhaneh, a kind of heroic behaviour that epitomizes chivalrous qualities known as Javanmardi.

For instance, he once had a match with Russian wrestler Alexander Medved who had an injured right knee. When Takhti found out that Medved was injured, he avoided  touching the injured leg and tried to attack the other leg instead. He lost the match, but showed that he valued honorable behavior more than reaching victory.

Another example of his character comes from a match in Moscow. After defeating the then-world champion Anatoli Albul, Takhti saw the sorrow on the face of Albul's mother. Takhti went to her and said, "I'm sorry about the result, but your son is a great wrestler." She smiled and kissed him.

Social and political activisms 

Takhti was known for his anti-regime views. He was a pro-Mossadegh activist and member of Second National Front and his death sparked a number of anti-Shah demonstrations.

In 1962, a terrible earthquake occurred in Bou'in-Zahra in western Iran, killing over 12,000. Takhti was deeply touched by the suffering. Already one of Iran's biggest stars, he began to walk one of the main avenues of Tehran, asking for assistance for the victims. He inspired other champions to follow in his footsteps, and thousands gave to alleviate the suffering.

Death and legacy

Takhti was found dead in his hotel room on January 7, 1968. The Iranian government officially proclaimed his death a suicide. However, some claim that he was murdered because of his political activities against the Pahlavi regime, accusing SAVAK, the Iranian intelligence agency at that time.  Because he was a national hero, his funeral drew hundreds of thousands of mourners after being organized by Hossein Towfigh, editor in chief of the (now defunct) Towfigh magazine.  The magazine issued a special edition of their popular weekly magazine where they caricatured Takhti with angel wings flying high above the throngs of Iranian mourners at his own funeral with a caption that read "Don't cry for me, cry for your own plight."   Towfigh magazine was shut down by the Shah for several months after printing this cartoon.  He is buried at Ebn-e Babooyeh cemetery in Southern part of Tehran, near Shahr-e Ray, where he is commemorated every year by his fans.

Takhti struggled with depression particularly regarding problems with his wife. Two days before his death Takhti created his will transferring the guardianship of his son to a colleague and instructions on what to do with his properties.

Takhti was survived by his wife and son, Babak Takhti, an author and translator. Babak has heavily criticized the rumors that his father was killed and confirmed his father took his life. The movie Takhti, begun by Ali Hatami and finished by Behrooz Afkhami, examined some of the theories about Takhti's death.

In Film
 Takhti (1997)
 Gholamreza Takhti (2019)
 The Sheik (Documentary [shown in archive footage]) (2014)

References

External links 

A poem by Siavash Kasrai about Takhti
 Mohtāj Rasouli, In Memory of Jahān Pahlavān Takhti, in Persian, Jadid Online, 7 January 2008, . Shokā Sahrāi, an audio slideshow, Jadid Online, 7 January 2008,  (3 min 47 sec).Some reminiscences of Gholamreza Takhti by his friends, in Persian, Jadid Online, 7 January 2008, .
 Bahār Navā'i, Takhti at British Museum (Takhti dar Muzeh-ye Britāniā), in Persian, Jadid Online, 2 March 2009, .An audio slideshow, Jadid Online, 2 March 2009,  (3 min 57 sec).

1930 births
1968 suicides
Olympic wrestlers of Iran
Olympic gold medalists for Iran
Olympic silver medalists for Iran
People from Tehran
Wrestlers at the 1952 Summer Olympics
Wrestlers at the 1956 Summer Olympics
Wrestlers at the 1960 Summer Olympics
Wrestlers at the 1964 Summer Olympics
Iranian male sport wrestlers
Asian Games gold medalists for Iran
National Front (Iran) people
Olympic medalists in wrestling
Asian Games medalists in wrestling
Pahlevans of Iran
Wrestlers at the 1958 Asian Games
World Wrestling Championships medalists
Medalists at the 1960 Summer Olympics
Medalists at the 1956 Summer Olympics
Medalists at the 1952 Summer Olympics
Medalists at the 1958 Asian Games
20th-century Iranian people
Suicides in Iran
1968 deaths
World Wrestling Champions